Conasprella lucida is a species of predatory sea snail, a marine gastropod mollusk in the family Conidae, the cone snails, cone shells or cones.

Description
The size of the shell varies between 14 mm and 54 mm.

Distribution
The species is found in the Eastern Pacific, occurring off Baja California, Mexico to Peru and off the Galápagos Islands.

References

 Puillandre N., Duda T.F., Meyer C., Olivera B.M. & Bouchet P. (2015). One, four or 100 genera? A new classification of the cone snails. Journal of Molluscan Studies. 81: 1-23

Gallery

External links
 Conus lucidus - pictures
 Cone Shells - Knights of the Sea
 

lucida
Gastropods described in 1828